The Canadian Theatre Review is a quarterly magazine publishing critical analysis and coverage of current theatre developments, expanding the practice of criticism in Canadian theatre. It is published by the University of Toronto Press and is available in print and online. The Canadian Theatre Review was founded by Don Rubin.

Abstracting and indexing
CTR is abstracted and indexed in:
 Canadian Almanac & Directory
 Canadian Periodical Index
 Canadian Reference Centre
 CrossRef
 EJS EBSCO Electronic Journals Service
 Google Scholar
 International Bibliography of Book Reviews of Scholarly Literature on the Humanities and Social Sciences (IBR)
 International Bibliography of Periodical Literature on the Humanities and Social Sciences (IBZ)
 Project MUSE
 Microsoft Academic Search
 Scopus
 International Bibliography of Theatre & Dance
 Ulrich's Periodicals Directory

References

External links

University of Toronto Press academic journals
Theatre magazines
Magazines established in 1975
Magazines published in Toronto
Quarterly magazines published in Canada